The Liberia national basketball team is the national basketball team representing Liberia. It is administrated by the Liberia Basketball Federation. Its last qualification to the FIBA Africa Championship dates back to 2007. Its most noteworthy international performance was in 1983 when Liberia finished among Africa's 10 elite basketball teams. According to the website, Afrobasket.com, the Liberia National Basketball team has not been in existence since 2013.

Current squad
Team for the AfroBasket 2007. (last publicized squad)

At the AfroBasket 2007 in Angola, Raphael M. Quaye played most minutes and recorded most assists and steals for Liberia.

Depth chart

Notable players
Other current notable players from Liberia:

Competitive record

Summer Olympics
yet to qualify

World championships
yet to qualify

FIBA Africa Championship

African Games

1965-2003 : Did not qualify
2007 : 11th
2011-2015 : Did not qualify

Past rosters
1983 FIBA Africa Championship: finished 9th among 10 teams

2007 FIBA Africa Championship: finished 16th among 16 teams

John Bing, Jethro Bing, Varney Tulay, Marcus Wolo, Fitzgerald Cole, Alphonso Kuiah, Raphael Quaye, Francis Fayiah, Alvin Tapeh, Mark Smith, Joseph Lackey, Richelieu Allison, Cephus Solo, Meshach McBorrough, Samuel Assembe (Coach: Allan Jallah)

See also
Liberia women's national basketball team
Liberia national under-19 basketball team

References

External links
Africabasket – Liberia Men National Team
Welcome to Friends and Supporters of Liberian Basketball, Inc.
Fiba Africa – Official Website
Liberia Basketball Records at FIBA Archive
Welcome to Liberia #1 Online Basketball Portal

Liberia
Basketball
Basketball teams in Liberia
Basketball
1964 establishments in Liberia